The 2013 European Short Track Speed Skating Championships took place between 18 and 20 January 2013 at the Malmö Arena in Malmö, Sweden.

Schedule
All times are local (UTC+1).

Medal summary

Medal table

Men's events

Women's events

Participating nations 

  (1)
  (10)
  (1)
  (9)
  (2)
  (1)
  (5)
  (10)
  (9)
  (10)
  (1)
  (10)
  (2)
  (1)
  (10)
  (10)
  (4)
  (10)
  (1)
  (1)
  (2)
  (1)
  (1)
  (2)
  (9)

See also
 Short track speed skating
 European Short Track Speed Skating Championships

References

External links
 Detailed results
 Results overview

European Short Track Speed Skating Championships
European Short Track Speed Skating Championships
European
European Short Track Speed Skating Championships
International speed skating competitions hosted by Sweden
Sports competitions in Malmö